Emure is a town in the Ekiti State of Nigeria. It is also called Emure Ekiti. It became much better known in the US after the king of Emure's grandson Adewale Ogunleye made it into the NFL for the Chicago Bears.

Emure Ekiti is one of the more prosperous towns in Ekiti. Emure consists of four ancient quarters named Oke Emure, Odo Emure, Idamudu and Ogbontioro.

Education system

Education is taken very important. Emure Ekiti has some public secondary schools:

 Ijaloke Grammar School 
 Akeju Business College
 Orija High School
 Ekiti State Government Science College Emure 
 Emure Model High School
 Eporo High School
 Anaye Community Grammar School

And numerous private secondary schools such as

 Apostolic Faith Secondary School, which is one of the most standard school in Emure Ekiti and her environs.
 Progressive Group of Schools
 St. Paul Grammar School
 God's own comprehensive College
 Christ Our Foundation
 Christ Victory College

References 

Local Government Areas in Ekiti State